Yanabi al-Muwadda is a hadith collection purportedly authored in Baghdad in 1395 AH by Sulaiman ibn Khawajah Killan Ibrahim ibn Baba Khawajah al-Balkhi al-Qunduzi. It is book that explains importance of love of the ahly bait of Muhammad, specially Imam Ali ibn Abu talib. It quotes from Mawaddat al-Qurba Book of Mir Sayyid Ali Hamadani.

Sunnis correctly dismiss the book as unreliable. Not only is the author not known to the vast majority of Sunnis, but his time is too late, a whole millennium after the Golden Era of Hadith, for anyone to take him seriously.

However, dismissals like these were not accepted by Shias, who would insist that he was one of the greatest Hanafi scholars of all time, even though his Hanafi fiqh related works are virtually unknown to shias. His work and name can only be found in some of the shia websites otherwise he is unknown to the muslims at large.

References

Hadith collections